Aegomorphus galapagoensis is a species of beetle in the family Cerambycidae. It was described by Linell in 1899.

References

Aegomorphus
Beetles described in 1899